Luke Hughes may refer to:

Luke Hughes (baseball) (born 1984), Australian baseball player
Luke Hughes (furniture designer), English furniture designer
Luke Hughes (ice hockey) (born 2003), American ice hockey player